John Archibald (born 14 November 1990) is a Scottish racing cyclist, who currently rides for UCI ProTeam .

Career
He competed in the men's individual pursuit event at the 2018 Commonwealth Games. He reached the final, winning the silver medal. Archibald became a double British champion after winning the British National Individual Pursuit Championships at the British National Track Championships in 2019 and 2020.

Personal life
He is the brother of Scottish cyclist Katie Archibald.

Major results

2018
 2018–19 UCI Track Cycling World Cup
1st  Team pursuit – London
2nd  Team pursuit – Milton
 National Track Championships
1st  Points race
3rd  Individual pursuit
3rd  Team pursuit
 2nd  Individual pursuit, Commonwealth Games
 4th Time trial, National Road Championships
2019
 National Track Championships
1st  Individual pursuit
1st  Team pursuit
 National Road Championships
2nd Time trial
3rd Road race
 3rd  Team relay, UCI Road World Championships
2020
 National Track Championships
1st  Individual pursuit
1st  Team pursuit
2021
 5th Time trial, National Road Championships
2022
 Commonwealth Games
2nd  Scratch race
6th Time trial
 4th Time trial, National Road Championships

References

External links
 

1990 births
Living people
British male cyclists
Scottish male cyclists
Scottish track cyclists
Sportspeople from Edinburgh
Cyclists at the 2018 Commonwealth Games
Commonwealth Games silver medallists for Scotland
Commonwealth Games medallists in cycling
Medallists at the 2018 Commonwealth Games